Anton Janssen (born 10 August 1963) is a Dutch former football manager and player. He is mostly known for his tenure as a player for PSV Eindhoven where he was part of their European Cup victory in 1988.

Playing career
In his youth, Janssen played for SV Leones from Beneden-Leeuwen, where he made his debut in the first team at the age of seventeen. Janssen played professional football from 1982 to 2000 with, in chronological order, NEC, Fortuna Sittard, PSV, Kortrijk, again Fortuna and finally again with NEC. His greatest personal achievement was the victory of the Europa Cup I with PSV in 1988 when he scored the decisive penalty-kick in the final against Benfica, after coming on as a substitute.

Honours

Player
PSV
Eredivisie: 1987–88, 1988–89
KNVB Cup: 1987–88, 1988–89
European Cup: 1987–88

References

1963 births
Living people
People from Tiel
Dutch footballers
Eredivisie players
Eerste Divisie players
Belgian Pro League players
PSV Eindhoven players
NEC Nijmegen players
Fortuna Sittard players
K.V. Kortrijk players
Dutch football managers
NEC Nijmegen managers
De Treffers managers

Association football midfielders
Dutch expatriate sportspeople in Belgium
Expatriate footballers in Belgium
Dutch expatriate footballers
Footballers from Gelderland